Jean Bizet (born 30 August 1947) is a French politician of The Republicans who currently serves as a member of the Senate of France, representing the Manche department. Since March 2010, he is the chairman of the European Affairs Committee.

In the Republicans’ 2016 presidential primaries, Bizet endorsed Nicolas Sarkozy as the party's candidate for the office of President of France.

References

Page on the Senate website

1947 births
Living people
People from Manche
Politicians from Normandy
The Republicans (France) politicians
Rally for the Republic politicians
Union for a Popular Movement politicians
Gaullism, a way forward for France
French Senators of the Fifth Republic
Mayors of places in Normandy
Senators of Manche
French veterinarians